Fábio Aurélio Rodrigues (born 24 September 1979) is a Brazilian former professional footballer who played for Grêmio, São Paulo, Valencia and Liverpool. He played as either a left back or left winger and represented Brazil at under-17 and under-20 levels and at the 2000 Sydney Olympics.

Personal life
Aurélio was born on 24 September 1979 in São Carlos, Brazil to parents Mario and Neide. He holds dual citizenship of both Brazil and Italy. He has one sister, who is married to fellow Brazilian footballer Edu. Fábio married his wife Elaine in January 2000 and they have two children, Fábio (born December 2001) and Victoria (born 2006).

Club career

São Paulo
Aurélio is an academy graduate of São Paulo and made his senior debut for the club 1997, at the age of 17. During his time at the club, he made over 50 first team appearances and represented his native Brazil at both under-17 and under-20 levels, as well as at the 2000 Sydney Olympics. He was also part of the squads which ended as runners-up in the Campeonato Paulista in 1996 and 1997, and as champions in 1998 and 2000.

Valencia
Aurélio joined Spanish club Valencia after the 2000 Olympics on a six-year contract. The 2001–02 season would see his first major trophy win, when he helped Rafael Benítez's team to their first La Liga championship in 31 years. The next year, Aurélio established himself as one of the league's best left-backs after scoring eight league goals (ten in all competitions). The 2003–04 season was another big year for Valencia, winning both the domestic La Liga championship as well as the 2003–04 UEFA Cup, defeating Marseille 2–0 in the latter competition's final. Aurélio, however, missed most of the season with a broken leg, managing only two games.

Liverpool

With his six-year contract having expired, Aurélio left Valencia to join English Premier League side Liverpool on a Bosman free transfer in July 2006, becoming the first Brazilian to sign for the club. He cited the chance to rejoin former manager Rafael Benítez as a key factor in his decision, telling the Liverpool Echo: "I am going to a new club in which the trainer knows me, to see if I can conquer the objectives I have set myself. The most important moments I had in my career were the titles [with Valencia] and that was with Benítez. He trusted me and he continues to trust me and that is what I value more." On 5 July, the transfer was confirmed by Liverpool.

Aurélio made his debut for the club in the FA Community Shield victory over Chelsea on 13 August and played a key part in Liverpool's squad during his first season, notably providing two assists for Peter Crouch and Daniel Agger in a 4–1 win over fellow title contenders Arsenal on 31 March 2007. Aurélio, however, soon suffered a setback as he injured his achilles tendon on 3 April in a UEFA Champions League first leg tie against PSV. He missed the remainder of Liverpool's 2006–07 season, meaning that he played only 25 games in his first year on Merseyside. He returned to action the following season on 18 September, coming on as a late substitute in a 1–1 draw against Porto in the Champions League group phase.

Aurélio scored his first goal for Liverpool on 2 March 2008 in a Premier League match win against Bolton Wanderers at Reebok Stadium. The final score was 3–1, with Aurélio scoring Liverpool's third with a volley from a Xabi Alonso corner. Aurélio scored again on 7 February 2009 against Portsmouth at Fratton Park with a free-kick into the bottom corner, getting his team back on level terms and helping Liverpool towards a 3–2 victory. His next goal was the third in a 4–1 victory over perennial rivals Manchester United in March 2009.

Aurélio went on to establish himself as Liverpool's first choice left-back but was again beset by injury. In the team's 1–1 draw with Chelsea in a Champions League semi-final first leg clash, Aurélio tore his adductor muscle after a forceful impact with Joe Cole and as a result was ruled out for the rest of the season. In the summer of 2009, while returning from the injury, he was injured playing beach football with his children. He returned a month into the season.

Rafael Benítez confirmed on 25 May 2010 that Aurélio would leave Liverpool after rejecting a pay-as-you-play offer. Following a change of manager, on 1 August 2010, Aurelio re-signed for Liverpool on a two-year deal. He made his first appearance in his second spell for the club in a pre-season game against Borussia Mönchengladbach the day after re-signing, coming on as a substitute and wearing the captain's armband for the closing stages of the match. New Liverpool manager Roy Hodgson declared his delight at being able to re-sign Aurélio and, during an interview with the club's T.V channel, said, "I was quite surprised when I found out he was fully fit and hadn't been offered a new contract, so I think it was a bit of an obvious thing to do. I said, 'Rather than move to another Barclays Premier League club, why don't you stay with us?'" Aurélio opted to give up the number 12 shirt he wore prior to re-signing for the club back in July and chose the number 6 shirt instead because that is the one that he had worn when playing in Brazil; The number 12 shirt was passed to Dani Pacheco.

Of his first four games in the 2010–11 season, three came in the UEFA Europa League. He then picked up an achilles injury before making his comeback as a substitute against West Ham United on 20 November 2010, in a match which Liverpool won 3–0. Aurélio played in Liverpool's FA Cup third round match that resulted in a 1–0 loss against Manchester United at Old Trafford on 9 January 2011. This was Kenny Dalglish's first match back in charge of Liverpool. On 11 April 2011, Aurélio returned from the injury to play in Liverpool's 3–0 home win over Manchester City. On 17 April 2011, he started at left back against Arsenal at Emirates Stadium, where he picked up a hamstring injury and was replaced by youngster Jack Robinson. Aurélio started Liverpool's last game of the 2010–11 season and Liverpool's final game of the pre-season against former club Valencia at Anfield, which Liverpool won 2–0. He started his first game of the 2011–12 season with a 5–1 win against League One Oldham Athletic in an FA Cup tie. He played 70 minutes before being replaced by Jon Flanagan. He made a substitute appearance for Liverpool against Wolverhampton Wanderers.

On 12 May 2012, Liverpool manager Kenny Dalglish revealed that Aurélio's contract was coming to an end and he would be leaving Liverpool at the end of the 2011–12 season after six seasons at the club.

Grêmio
On 24 May 2012, having only appeared twice in the Premier League the previous season, Aurélio returned to Brazil at the request of Vanderlei Luxemburgo to sign for Grêmio on a free transfer. However, his time at the club was marred by a torn cruciate ligament injury which saw him miss eight months of football, and he made only five appearances before announcing his retirement on 4 April 2014. Following his retirement, he revealed that he had been forced out of the club by chairman Fabio Koff after Luxemborgo had been sacked. Both Koff and club director, Rui Costa denied the allegations, alleging instead that he simply could not play anymore.

International career
Having previously represented them at under-17 and under-20 level, Aurélio played for the Brazil Olympic team at the Sydney Olympics in 2000.

In October 2009, Aurélio was called into the Brazil senior team for friendly matches against England and Oman, but was not able to make his full debut as he had to withdraw from the squad due to injury.

Honours
Valencia
La Liga: 2001–02, 2003–04
UEFA Cup: 2003–04
UEFA Super Cup: 2004

Liverpool
FA Community Shield: 2006
League Cup: 2011–12

References

External links

 LFChistory.net player profile
 
 
 
 Premier League profile

1979 births
People from São Carlos
Living people
Association football fullbacks
Association football utility players
Brazilian footballers
Brazil under-20 international footballers
Brazilian expatriate footballers
Expatriate footballers in Spain
Expatriate footballers in England
São Paulo FC players
Valencia CF players
UEFA Cup winning players
Liverpool F.C. players
Grêmio Foot-Ball Porto Alegrense players
Campeonato Brasileiro Série A players
La Liga players
Premier League players
Olympic footballers of Brazil
Footballers at the 2000 Summer Olympics
Brazilian emigrants to Italy
Naturalised citizens of Italy
Brazilian people of Italian descent
Footballers from São Paulo (state)